The DODO (spelled all caps.) was a cyclecar built in 1912, in Detroit, Michigan.

History 

The DODO was designed by a young engineer named Karl Probst. It was a two-seater tandem cyclecar.  The prototype had a 56" tread, but Probst wanted to slim it to 32". However, a production vehicle never was made. Later, Probst became one of the principal engineers in development of the World War II Jeep while working at the American Bantam company.

Model

References 

Defunct motor vehicle manufacturers of the United States
Motor vehicle manufacturers based in Michigan
Defunct manufacturing companies based in Detroit